Tom Sparrow may refer to:
 Tom Sparrow (Australian footballer) (born 2000), Australian rules footballer
 Tom Sparrow (Welsh footballer) (born 2002), Welsh association footballer